The 2020 Sky Blue FC season is the team's eleventh season as a professional women's soccer team, and their eighth season as a member of the National Women's Soccer League.

The season was originally scheduled to begin on March 18, 2020. However, due to the COVID-19 pandemic, the start date was delayed. Preseason matches were cancelled on March 12 and on April 4 it was announced that a moratorium on training would continue through May 5, 2020. On April 24, the NWSL announced the moratorium on training would be extended through May 15. The start date of the season was further shifted to an indeterminate point, with the league promising to "include an appropriate preseason training period" before launching the season. Small group training resumed on May 25, and on May 27 the NWSL announced that the 2020 NWSL Challenge Cup would mark the league's return to action following the COVID-19 pandemic. The tournament was hosted in Utah from June 27 to July 26.

On June 22, 2020, the NWSL confirmed that the regular season had been cancelled and the Challenge Cup would act as the 2020 season. Sky Blue finished the preliminary round as the seventh seed before ultimately being eliminated in the semi-finals by the Chicago Red Stars.

On August 25, the NWSL announced that the season would continue with a Fall Series beginning on September 5. Per the rules of the series, Sky Blue played four matches as part of a three-team regional pod with the Chicago Red Stars and Washington Spirit. Sky Blue ultimately placed fourth in the Fall Series.

Team

First-team roster

Challenge Cup roster
On June 23, 2020, Sky Blue announced their twenty-six player roster for the 2020 NWSL Challenge Cup. In the same announcement, the club confirmed that three players contracted to the club (Carli Lloyd, Caprice Dydasco, and Mallory Pugh) had been left out through injury. On June 26, Madison Tiernan was also ruled out of the tournament with an injury.

Coaching staff

Competitions

Overview

Preseason
Preseason training and matches were originally scheduled to take place beginning on March 28, but on March 12 all preseason matches were cancelled.

Matches

National Women's Soccer League

Regular season

Matches
The regular season schedule was announced on February 25, 2020. However, following the onset of the COVID-19 pandemic, the regular season was eventually cancelled and replaced by the 2020 NWSL Challenge Cup.

Fall Series
On September 1, the NWSL announced a partial schedule for the NWSL Fall Series. The full schedule was subsequently announced on September 3.

Standings

Results by matchday

Matches

Challenge Cup

Preliminary round

Standings

Results by matchday

Matches
Sky Blue were originally slated to play the Orlando Pride as part of the preliminary round of the competition. However, on June 22 it was reported that several of Orlando's players and staff had tested positive for COVID-19 and that Orlando would be withdrawing from the competition. A revised schedule was subsequently announced on June 23.

Knockout round

Quarter-finals

Semi-finals

Squad statistics

Appearances

Goals and assists

Shutouts

Disciplinary record

Transfers

2020 NWSL College Draft

Transfers in

Transfers out

Loans out

New contracts

Awards

Team
 Most Valuable Player: Kailen Sheridan
 Player's Player: Kailen Sheridan
 Unsung Hero: Sarah Woldmoe
 Defender of the Year: Gina Lewandowski
 Newcomer of the Year: Margaret Purce

Challenge Cup
 SBFC Most Valuable Player: Kailen Sheridan

NWSL Challenge Cup
 Golden Glove: Kailen Sheridan

2020 NCAA Woman of the Year Award

Nominated
 Evelyne Viens
 Kaleigh Riehl

References

Sky Blue FC
Sky Blue FC
NJ/NY Gotham FC seasons
Sky Blue FC